The Baltimore Declaration is a statement written by six Episcopal priests in the Diocese of Maryland in 1991 regarding affirmation of Christian orthodoxy. It is sometimes used as a manifesto by Episcopal factions which wish to reaffirm orthodox Christian principles within the Episcopal Church in the United States of America.

Signers
 The Rev. Ronald S. Fisher
 The Rev. Alvin F. Kimel, Jr.
 The Rev. R. Gary Matthewes-Green
 The Rev. William N. McKeachie
 The Rev. Frederick J. Ramsay
 The Rev. Philip Burwell Roulette

External links
 A short description of the Baltimore Declaration
 The Baltimore Declaration (full text with brief introduction)

Episcopal Church (United States)